Bertalan Papp (7 September 1913 – 8 August 1992) was a Hungarian fencer. He won two gold medals in the team sabre events at the 1948 and 1952 Summer Olympics.

References

External links
 

1913 births
1992 deaths
Hungarian male sabre fencers
Olympic fencers of Hungary
Fencers at the 1948 Summer Olympics
Fencers at the 1952 Summer Olympics
Olympic gold medalists for Hungary
Sportspeople from Hajdú-Bihar County
Olympic medalists in fencing
Medalists at the 1948 Summer Olympics
Medalists at the 1952 Summer Olympics